Giesler is a surname and may refer to:

Paul Giesler (1895–1945), member of the NSDAP, from 1941 NSDAP
Hermann Giesler (1898-1987), German architect
Jerry Giesler (1886-1962), American criminal defense lawyer
Christian Giesler (born 1970), current bass guitar player for Kreator
Walter John Giesler (1910–1976), American soccer player
Jon William Giesler (born December 23, 1956),  American football player